This was the first edition of the tournament.

Maja Chwalińska and Jesika Malečková won the title, defeating Berfu Cengiz and Anastasia Tikhonova in the final, 2–6, 6–4, [10–7].

Seeds

Draw

Draw

References
Main Draw

Edge Istanbul - Doubles